Opatroides is a genus of darkling beetles in the family Tenebrionidae. There are at least three described species in Opatroides.

Species
These three species belong to the genus Opatroides:
 Opatroides punctulatus Brull, 1832 g b
 Opatroides thoracicus (Rosenhauer, 1856) g
 Opatroides vicinus Fairmaire, 1896 g
Data sources: i = ITIS, c = Catalogue of Life, g = GBIF, b = Bugguide.net

References

Further reading

External links

 
 

Tenebrioninae